Aleš Opatrný (born 18 September 1981) is a Czech equestrian. He competed in the individual jumping event at the 2020 Summer Olympics.

References

External links
 

1981 births
Living people
Czech male equestrians
Olympic equestrians of the Czech Republic
Equestrians at the 2020 Summer Olympics
Show jumping riders
People from Hořovice
Sportspeople from the Central Bohemian Region